The 2017 Clemson Tigers football team represented Clemson University during the 2017 NCAA Division I FBS football season. The Tigers were led by head coach Dabo Swinney in his ninth full year and tenth overall since taking over midway through 2008 season. They played their home games at Memorial Stadium, also known as "Death Valley", and competed in the Atlantic Division of the Atlantic Coast Conference.

Clemson won the ACC for the third consecutive season by beating Miami (FL) in the ACC Championship game, 38–3. They received their third straight bid to the College Football Playoff, earning the number one seed. The Tigers fell to eventual national champion Alabama in the semifinal game played at the Sugar Bowl, 6–24.

Previous season 
The Tigers entered the 2017 season as defending national champions, having finished the 2016 season 14–1 with a 35–31 win over Alabama in the CFP National Championship game.

Personnel

Coaching staff 
Head coach Dabo Swinney added one new addition to the Tigers' coaching staff in January 2017, Todd Bates who was the defensive line coach at Jacksonville State University was hired after losing Dan Brooks to retirement and Marion Hobby signing with the Jacksonville Jaguars. Mickey Conn was promoted from defensive analyst to co-defensive back coach.

Schedule 
Clemson announced their schedule for the 2017 season on January 24, 2017. The Tigers' schedule consisted of 7 home games and 5 away games. Clemson hosted conference opponents Boston College, Florida State, Georgia Tech, and Wake Forest, and traveled to Louisville, NC State, Syracuse, and Virginia Tech. The Tigers hosted out of conference games against Kent State, Auburn, and The Citadel, and traveled to arch rival South Carolina to close out the regular season. Clemson's out of conference opponents represented the MAC, SoCon, and SEC.

The Tigers played 10 total teams who played in the postseason in the 2016 season: 2 New Year's Six participants (Auburn and Florida State), 7 other bowl teams (Boston College, Georgia Tech, Louisville, NC State, South Carolina, Wake Forest, Virginia Tech), and 1 FCS playoff participant (Citadel).

Rankings

Roster 

Source:

Recruiting class

Transfers 
Clemson lost 6 players due to transfer, Running back Tyshon Dye, Offensive Linemen Jake Fruhmorgen, Cornerback Adrian Baker, Defensive tackle Scott Pagano, Safety Korrin Wiggins and Defensive End LaSamuel Davis all announced they would transfer from the program.

Game summaries

Kent State

Auburn

at Louisville

Boston College

at Virginia Tech

Wake Forest

at Syracuse

Georgia Tech

at North Carolina State

Florida State

The Citadel

at South Carolina

vs Miami (FL) – ACC Championship Game

CFP Playoff

Alabama – Sugar Bowl

Awards and honors

Individual awards 

Broyles Award – Tony Elliot

All Americans 
Clelin Ferrell – AP 1st team, FWAA 2nd team
Mitch Hyatt – AP 2nd team, FWAA 2nd team, Walter Camp 2nd team
Christian Wilkins – AP 2nd team, Walter Camp 2nd team
Dorian O'Daniel – AP 2nd team
Tyrone Crowder – AP 3rd team
Austin Bryant – AP 3rd team, FWAA 1st team, Walter Camp 2nd team

All-ACC Teams 
1st Team

Mitch Hyatt, Tackle  Justin Falcinelli, Center  Tyrone Crowder, Guard  Clelin Ferrell, Defensive End  Christian Wilkins, Defensive Tackle  Dexter Lawrence, Defensive Tackle

2nd Team

Austin Bryant, Defensive End  Dorian O'Daniel, Linebacker

3rd Team

Travis Etienne, Running Back  Hunter Renfrow, Wide Receiver  Deon Cain, Wide Receiver  Taylor Hearn, Guard  Kendall Joseph, Linebacker

2018 NFL Draft

Undrafted Free Agents

References 

Clemson
Clemson Tigers football seasons
Atlantic Coast Conference football champion seasons
Clemson Tigers football